Macarena Gandulfo (born 3 November 1993) is an Argentine handball player for Ardèche Le Pouzin HB07 Handball and the Argentina women's national handball team.

References

External links

Argentine female handball players
1993 births
Living people
Pan American Games medalists in handball
Pan American Games silver medalists for Argentina
Handball players at the 2015 Pan American Games
Handball players at the 2019 Pan American Games
Expatriate handball players
Argentine expatriate sportspeople in Brazil
Argentine expatriate sportspeople in Spain
Argentine expatriate sportspeople in Romania
Handball players at the 2016 Summer Olympics
Olympic handball players of Argentina
Sportspeople from Buenos Aires
South American Games silver medalists for Argentina
South American Games medalists in handball
Competitors at the 2018 South American Games
Argentine people of Italian descent
Medalists at the 2015 Pan American Games
Medalists at the 2019 Pan American Games
20th-century Argentine women
21st-century Argentine women